WMMS-HD2 (100.7-2 FM) is a digital subchannel of WMMS, a commercial radio station licensed to Cleveland, Ohio, and features programming from the Black Information Network. Owned by iHeartMedia, WMMS-HD2 serves Greater Cleveland and surrounding Northeast Ohio. Using the proprietary technology HD Radio for its main digital transmission, WMMS-HD2 is rebroadcast over low-power analog Cleveland translator W256BT (99.1 FM), and streams online via iHeartRadio. WMMS-HD2's studios are located at the Six Six Eight Building in downtown Cleveland's Gateway District, while the WMMS-HD2 and W256BT transmitters reside in Seven Hills and Parma, respectively.

History

On April 25, 2006, iHeartMedia (then known as Clear Channel Communications) announced the launch of several new HD Radio "multicast channels" in various markets across the United States; among these was WMMS-HD2, a digital subchannel of Cleveland rock station WMMS (100.7 FM), with a planned "classic alternative" format. As late as February 22, 2007, WMMS-HD2 was still not on the air, but by March 2, 2007, the new channel had gone "live". In the beginning, WMMS-HD2 was mostly automated and commercial-free. By February 2008, and lasting until at least 2010, WMMS-HD2 broadcast an active rock format under the brand "Nitro"; WMMS.com referred to the programming as "Today's Hard Rock". As of July 2011, WMMS-HD2 had reverted to an alternative rock format, this time programmed nationally via Premium Choice; and had also begun serving as a local affiliate for Sixx Sense with Nikki Sixx, a mix of talk and alternative rock syndicated via Premiere Networks. As of August 2011, WMMS-HD2 had rebranded as "The Alternative Project".

On May 23, 2012, WMMS-HD2 began rebroadcasting over low-power Cleveland translator W256BT (99.1 FM) under the brand "99X". The move was the latest in a trend made possible by a May 3, 2010, decision by the Federal Communications Commission (FCC). Although low-power FM translators in the United States are generally not permitted to originate their own programming, the FCC decision affirmed that translators are free to retransmit the programming of HD Radio digital subchannels – effectively creating new analog "radio stations" on the FM band – and thereby expanding the potential audience of digital-only channels like WMMS-HD2 that require an HD Radio receiver. The translator's launch marked the return of alternative rock to the Cleveland radio market for the first time – via an analog signal – since WKRK-FM had dropped the format from its main broadcast in 2011. The first song to air over this new rebroadcast was "Gold on the Ceiling" by The Black Keys. WMMS program director Bo Matthews (Alex Guitterez) was named the program director for 99X, having been "integral" to its launch.

As 99X, WMMS-HD2 continued to air Sixx Sense with Nikki Sixx, the syndicated mix of talk and rock hosted by Mötley Crüe co-founder Nikki Sixx; later, 99X would also air its weekend companion The Side Show Countdown with Nikki Sixx. On January 29, 2014, "Chris Tyler" Merluzzo was announced as the new program director for both WMMS and WMMS-HD2. Erika Lauren, co-host of The Alan Cox Show on WMMS, had begun hosting a local weekday morning music shift as of December 2015.

On December 21, 2017, WMMS-HD2 dropped the "99X" brand and replaced it with "ALT 99.1", the latest in a series of iHeartMedia alternative rock outlets to adopt the "ALT" brand following its adoption by KYSR/Los Angeles in August 2013; the change may have been related to a branding dispute with iHeartMedia rival Entercom. On February 1, 2018, Jason Carr was announced as the new assistant program director for WMMS, as well as program director for WMMS-HD2.

On June 29, 2020, fifteen stations owned by iHeartMedia in markets with large African-American populations, including WMMS-HD2, began stunting with a series of African-American speeches, interspersed with messages such as "Our Voices Will Be Heard" and "Our side of the story is about to be told," with a new format slated to launch the following day at 12:00 p.m. On June 30, it was made official that WMMS-HD2 would be a charter affiliate of iHeart's new Black Information Network, which is an all-news format specifically geared toward African-American listeners; WMMS-HD2's analog translator simulcast over W256BT was unaffected.

FM translator

W256BT began on November 2, 2004, as W262BN, a mostly silent radio translator licensed to Lorain, Ohio, free to transmit at 100.3 MHz. On April 22, 2011, W262BN adopted the callsign W259BI; changed its frequency to 99.7 MHz; and moved its transmitter to a cell phone tower in North Ridgeville. On May 23, 2012, W259BI adopted the callsign W256BT; changed its frequency to 99.1 MHz; changed its city of license to Cleveland; and began airing an alternative rock format as a separate analog radio station. The WMJI radio tower currently serves as the site of the W256BT transmitter.

Current programming
WMMS-HD2 primarily airs all-news radio via the Black Information Network; local traffic and weather updates are provided via the Total Traffic and Weather Network. WMMS-HD2 also satisfies FCC-mandated public affairs programming on Sunday mornings with the City Club of Cleveland's Friday Forum. WMMS-HD2 transmits text and images to HD Radio receivers, such as station IDs and artist and song information, known as Program Service Data (PSD); similarly, W256BT transmits text to compatible analog receivers via the Radio Data System (RDS). Both WMMS-HD2 and W256BT broadcast in stereo.

References

External links

FM translator

2007 establishments in Ohio
All-news radio stations in the United States
Black Information Network stations
Cleveland Monsters
HD Radio stations
IHeartMedia radio stations
Radio stations established in 2007
MMS-HD2